Edmond I de Bermingham (died 1612) was an Anglo-Irish lord.

Edmond was the first Lord Athenry to permanently reside at Dunmore, County Galway. His father had been forced to vacate Athenry, which had been the family's seat since about 1537, due to incessant warfare and famine during the middle years of the sixteenth century. Yet even these lands were subject to raids, notably by Teige Ó Flaithbheartaigh in 1589.

While he remained among the first class of the local gentry, his net worth and political influence were greatly diminished, and he was forced to mortgage and sell lands to merchants of The Tribes of Galway, many of whom became as prosperous and influential as his ancestors.

The final destruction of the original seat of the lordship, Athenry, in 1597 by Red Hugh O'Donnell, marked the final destruction of his hopes of financial recovery.

Notes

References
 History of Galway, James Hardiman, Galway, 1820
 The Abbey of Athenry, Martin J. Blake, Journal of the Galway Archaeological and Historical Society, volume II, part ii, 1902
 The Birmingham family of Athenry, H.T. Knox, J.G.A.H.S., volume ten, numbers iii and iv, 1916-17.
 Remarks on the walls and church of Athenry, Charles Mac Neill, J.G.A.H.S., volume 11, numbers iii and iv, 1921
 Old Galway, Maureen Donovan O'Sullivan, 1942.
 Punann Arsa:The Story of Athenry, County Galway, Martin Finnerty, Ballinasloe, 1951.
 Athenry: A Medieval Irish Town, Etienne Rynne, Athenry Historical Society, Athenry, 1992

People from County Galway
1612 deaths
Barons Athenry
Edmond I